Falling into Infinity is the fourth studio album by American progressive metal band Dream Theater, released on September 23, 1997, through EastWest Records. It is the band's only studio album to feature keyboardist Derek Sherinian, following the departure of Kevin Moore in 1994.

Falling into Infinity was produced by Kevin Shirley. The album's writing and pre-production phases were stressful periods for the band, as they were feeling constant pressure from the record label to deliver a more radio-friendly album. It was recorded in June 1997 at Avatar Studios (previously known as Power Station Studios) in Manhattan.

Background
Following a brief tour in support of the A Change of Seasons EP, Dream Theater entered Dream Factory Studios in East Rutherford, New Jersey, in early 1996 to begin writing material for a new album. It was their first time writing with keyboardist Derek Sherinian, who replaced Kevin Moore in 1994. Around this time, Elektra Records was exerting pressure on the band to write concise, radio-friendly songs. Consequently, creative conflicts arose, with guitarist John Petrucci accepting the label's plea for change and drummer Mike Portnoy fighting against it.

For over a year, Dream Theater wrote songs without being given permission to record them; according to Portnoy, at one point they became so frustrated that they considered retirement. In March 1997, the band was finally given the go-ahead to record the new album with Kevin Shirley producing. By May, the band had enough material for a double album but was told to keep it to one disc for budget reasons. As a result, certain songs were not included on the final cut of the album, including "Raise the Knife", "Where Are You Now", "Cover My Eyes", "Speak to Me", "The Way It Used to Be", and "Metropolis Pt. 2", the latter of which was later expanded into its own album, with the rest being included on the 1999 fan club CD "Cleaning Out the Closet". Shirley made significant alterations to some of what was left on the album; most notably, he took the middle section out of "Burning My Soul" and turned it into what would become "Hell's Kitchen". Shirley also recommended that the band work with Desmond Child to re-write "You or Me", resulting in Petrucci being flown down to Florida to work on the song with Child. Following the sessions, the song became "You Not Me".

Actual recording for the album began on June 2 at The Power Station recording studio, known then as Avatar Studios from 1996 to 2017 (and reopening in 2020 as Power Station at BerkleeNYC), located at 441 West 53rd Street between Ninth and Tenth Avenues in the Hell's Kitchen neighborhood in Manhattan, New York City. In contrast to the difficult  writing and pre-production stages, the band considered the recording sessions trouble free and enjoyable. The album, titled Falling into Infinity, was completed on July 30. Originally, Petrucci and Portnoy wanted to call it Stream of Consciousness, but the rest of the band rejected the name because they felt it was too pompous (although the phrase "Stream of Consciousness" is found in the song "Lines in the Sand" and would later become the title of the instrumental piece on Train of Thought). Its eventual title was proposed by Petrucci, and its cover art was designed by Storm Thorgerson.

Composition

Falling into Infinity is the first Dream Theater album to feature multiple songs with lyrics by Mike Portnoy. Portnoy and the rest of the band were forced to write more lyrics following the departure of Kevin Moore. All of Portnoy's lyrics were inspired by his frustration with Elektra Records: "New Millennium" and "Just Let Me Breathe" are aimed at the music industry and label, and "Burning My Soul" targets A&R man Derek Oliver. John Petrucci wrote six lyrics for the album, including those for "Peruvian Skies"; lead singer James LaBrie and bassist John Myung each contributed lyrics to one song each, "Anna Lee" and "Trial of Tears" respectively; while "Hell's Kitchen" is an instrumental. Both "Peruvian Skies" and "Anna Lee" deal with the subject of child abuse. As is the case with most Dream Theater albums, the songs were given working titles during production; for example, "Lines in the Sand" and "Burning My Soul" were originally called "Cat's Tail" and "Carnival of Clams", respectively.

In the official Dream Theater biography Lifting Shadows, author Rich Wilson described Falling into Infinitys musical style as having an "accessible nature". In his review of the album for AllMusic, Jeremy Ulrey noted of the album: "Like many other progressive bands playing difficult music, Dream Theater inevitably chose to trim down both their bombastic production and intricate songwriting for a more laid-back approach, both live and in the studio." Its writing was inspired by a multitude of artists including Elton John.

Release

Falling into Infinity was released on September 23, 1997. In America, the album debuted at number 52 on the Billboard 200. Falling into Infinity received mixed reviews from critics and fans. In a three out of five star review for AllMusic, Jeremy Ulrey called it "the band's weakest effort since their debut." Rich Wilson has described it as "one of the patchier albums in the band's catalogue."

According to Lifting Shadows, Falling into Infinity was considered a commercial failure, failing to break any new ground for Dream Theater or increase their sales despite its more commercial direction. As a result of the creative and personal tensions experienced during the album's production phase, it has been described as the band's "most difficult album", and eventually led to their demanding to be free from record label interference for all future albums. Mike Portnoy has mentioned that if Elektra Records, Kevin Shirley, and Desmond Child were not involved in the making of the album, he would have made a "completely different record". In 2007, the band released a demo version of the album reflecting Portnoy's original song arrangements and track listing, including a live rehearsal of the original "Metropolis Pt. 2".

In contrast to Portnoy's comments, John Petrucci has spoken fondly of the album, and in a 2014 interview stated, "Maybe I could set the records straight: I think that’s a really big misunderstanding. The label didn’t have an influence on the album. We wrote the kind of album we wanted to write."

Track listing

PersonnelDream Theater:James LaBrie – lead vocals and backing vocals, arrangement
John Petrucci – guitar, background vocals, arrangement
Derek Sherinian – keyboards, backing vocals, arrangement
John Myung – bass, Chapman Stick on tracks 1 and 8, arrangement
Mike Portnoy – drums, percussion, backing vocals, harmony vocals on track 1, arrangementAdditional credits:'
Doug Pinnick – additional vocals (track 7)
Kevin Shirley – engineering, mixing, production
Rich Alvy – engineering assistance
Barbara Lipke – engineering assistance
Dave Swope – mixing assistance
Leon Zervos – mastering
Storm Thorgerson – cover art

Chart performance

References

Dream Theater albums
1997 albums
Albums with cover art by Storm Thorgerson
East West Records albums
Albums produced by Kevin Shirley